The Rankine lecture is an annual lecture organised by the British Geotechnical Association named after William John Macquorn Rankine, an early contributor to the theory of soil mechanics.

This should not be confused with the biennial BGA Géotechnique Lecture.

The Rankine Lecture is held in March each year. In even-numbered years, the lecturer is from the UK. In odd-numbered years, the lecturer is from outside the UK. Each lecture is usually published in Géotechnique.

List of Rankine Lecturers

See also

 Named lectures
 Géotechnique Lecture

External links
 ICE Virtual Library - The Rankine Lecture
 British Geotechnical Association - List of Rankine Lecturers
 British Geotechnical Association

References

Geotechnical conferences
 
Science events in the United Kingdom
Science lecture series